The following article presents a summary of the 1990 football (soccer) season in Brazil, which was the 89th season of competitive football in the country.

Campeonato Brasileiro Série A

Quarterfinals

|}

Semifinals

|}

Final

Corinthians declared as the Campeonato Brasileiro champions by aggregate score of 2-0.

Relegation
The two worst placed teams in the first stage, which are São José-SP and Internacional-SP, were relegated to the following year's second level.

Campeonato Brasileiro Série B

Third stage

Final

Sport declared as the Campeonato Brasileiro Série B champions by aggregate score of 1-1.

Promotion
The champion and the runner-up, which are Sport and Atlético Paranaense, were promoted to the following year's first level.

Relegation
The four worst placed teams, which are Anapolina, Coritiba, Americano and Treze, were relegated to the following year's third level.

Campeonato Brasileiro Série C

Quarterfinals

|}

Semifinals

|}

Final

Atlético Goianiense declared as the Campeonato Brasileiro Série C champions by aggregate score of 0-0.

Promotion
The four quarterfinal winners, which are Atlético Goianiense, América-MG, Paraná and América-RN, were promoted to the following year's second level.

Copa do Brasil

The Copa do Brasil final was played between Flamengo and Goiás.

Flamengo declared as the cup champions by aggregate score of 1-0.

State championship champions

Youth competition champions

Other competition champions

Brazilian clubs in international competitions

Brazil national team
The following table lists all the games played by the Brazil national football team in official competitions and friendly matches during 1990.

Women's football

National team
The Brazil women's national football team did not play any matches in 1990.

References

 Brazilian competitions at RSSSF
 1990 Brazil national team matches at RSSSF
 1986-1996 Brazil women's national team matches at RSSSF

 
Seasons in Brazilian football
Brazil